Eternal Light or eternal light may refer to
 Sanctuary lamp, shines before the altar of religious sanctuaries
 The Eternal Light, 1944–89 NBC radio program on Jewish themes
 Eternal Light (video game), formerly titled Witches, combat game developed by Revistronic, cancelled in 2011
 Eternal light mushroom (Mycena luxaeterna) bioluminescent fungus
 Eternal Light Flagstaff, 1923 monumental flagstaff in Madison Square, Manhattan, New York
 Eternal Light Peace Memorial, 1938 Gettysburg Battlefield monument

See also
 Lux Aeterna (disambiguation) (from the Latin for "eternal light")
 Forugh-e Javidan (disambiguation) (from the Persian for "eternal light")
 Peak of eternal light, point on a body within the Solar System which is always in sunlight
 Eternal flame (disambiguation)
 There Is a Light That Never Goes Out, song by The Smiths